THAICOM 6 is a Thai satellite of the Thaicom series, operated by Thaicom Public Company Limited, a subsidiary of INTOUCH headquartered in Bangkok, Thailand. THAICOM 6 is colocated with Thaicom 5 at 78.5 degrees East, in geostationary orbit.

Overview
THAICOM 6 is a 3-axis stabilized spacecraft, carrying 18 active C-band transponders and 8 active Ku-band transponders. The Ku-band transponders are both addressed as well as beam-switched to broadband. THAICOM 6 provides communication service to Southeast Asia, Africa and Madagascar with its primary role being DTH service for Thailand.

Launch

The spacecraft was launched on 6 January 2014, by SpaceX on a Falcon 9 v1.1 launch vehicle.  The payload was delivered by SpaceX to a -apogee supersynchronous elliptical transfer orbit that will later be reduced by the satellite builder Orbital Sciences Corporation to an approximately  circular geostationary orbit.  The supersynchronous transfer orbit enables an inclination plane change with a lower expenditure of propellant by the satellite's kick motor.`

This launch was SpaceX's second transport of a payload to a Geostationary transfer orbit. Both the SES-8 SpaceX launch before this one and THAICOM 6 utilized a supersynchronous transfer orbit, but Thaicom 6 was at a somewhat greater apogee than that used for SES-8.

The Falcon 9 upper stage used to launch THAICOM 6 was left in a decaying elliptical low-Earth orbit which decayed over time and, on 28 May 2014, re-entered the atmosphere and burned up.

See also

 Thaicom 4
 Thaicom 5
 Thaicom 7
 Thaicom 8
 List of Falcon 9 launches

References

External links

 Thaicom 6 at Orbital.com

Communications satellites in geostationary orbit
Thaicom satellites
SpaceX commercial payloads
Spacecraft launched in 2014
2014 in Thailand
Satellites using the GEOStar bus